Rhopobota floccosa is a species of moth of the family Tortricidae. It is found in Hunan, China.

The wingspan is about 11 mm. The ground colour of the forewings is grey, but brown at the apex. The hindwings are grey.

Etymology
The species name refers to the sacculus with a tuft of hairs situated below the ventral edge of the basal opening in the male genitalia and is derived from Latin floccosus (meaning woolly).

References

Moths described in 2005
Eucosmini